Camargue is a natural region located south of Arles, France, between the Mediterranean Sea and the two arms of the Rhône delta. 

Camargue may also refer to:
Camargue (horse)
Rolls-Royce Camargue
Operation Camargue in the First Indochina War
Camargue cattle
Camargue equitation
Camargue red rice